The Resident is an American medical drama television series created by Amy Holden Jones, Hayley Schore, and Roshan Sethi for the Fox Broadcasting Company. Based on the book Unaccountable by Marty Makary, the series focuses on the lives and duties of staff members at Chastain Park Memorial Hospital, while delving into the bureaucratic practices of the hospital industry.

On May 17, 2021, Fox renewed the series for a fifth season, which premiered on September 21, 2021. On May 16, 2022, Fox renewed the series for a sixth season, which premiered on September 20, 2022.

Series overview

Episodes

Season 1 (2018)

Season 2 (2018–19)

Season 3 (2019–20)

Season 4 (2021)

Season 5 (2021–22)

Season 6 (2022–23)

Ratings

Season 1

Season 2

Season 3

Season 4

Season 5
Note: Live+3 day ratings have been stated where Live+7 day ratings are unavailable.

Season 6

Summary

Notes

References

External links
 
 
The Resident on Metacritic
The Resident on Rotten Tomatoes
Synopsis and episodes photos website

Lists of American drama television series episodes